Robin Polley (born 28 December 1998) is a Ghanaian professional footballer who plays as a rightback for Heracles Almelo. Born in the Netherlands, Polley represents Ghana internationally.

Club career
After playing in the youth academies of JHR, Spartaan '20 and Feyenoord, and making his debut for the latter's U21 team in the Beloften Eredivisie, Polley made the move to ADO Den Haag in 2018. On 23 November 2018, Polley signed a professional contract for three years with ADO Den Haag. Polley made his professional debut with ADO Den Haag in a 3–1 Eredivisie loss to PSV Eindhoven on 11 August 2019.

On 5 August 2021, he signed a three-year contract with Heracles Almelo.

International career
Polley represented the Ghana U23s at the 2019 Africa U-23 Cup of Nations.

Personal life
Polley is the son of the Ghanaian former footballer Prince Polley.

References

External links
 
 

1998 births
Living people
Footballers from Rotterdam
Ghanaian footballers
Olympic footballers of Ghana
Dutch footballers
Dutch people of Ghanaian descent
Association football fullbacks
Feyenoord players
ADO Den Haag players
FC Dordrecht players
Heracles Almelo players
Eredivisie players
Eerste Divisie players
Derde Divisie players